"Sleepy" is 1888 a short story by Anton Chekhov.

Publication
Chekhov wrote the story in the course of one day, while working upon The Steppe, so as to 'get some money to deal with the beginning-of-the-month payments', as he explained to Alexey Pleshcheyev in a 23 January letter. It was first published in Peterburgskaya Gazeta No. 24, 25 January 1888 issue, signed A. Chekhonte (А. Чехонте). In a shortened version and with re-written finale it then appeared in a collection called Gloomy People (Хмурые люди, Khmurye lyudi, 1890). Chekhov included it into Volume 5 of his Collected Works, published by Adolf Marks in 1899–1901.

Plot
 
Varka, a 13-year-old babysitter, sits all night long by the cradle trying desperately not to fall asleep for she knows she'd be severely beaten by her masters for that. Once she nods off, and gets it in the neck. The sleepless night by a screaming baby draws on and on, as the girl, eyes half-open, recalls horrors of her past: father dying of hernia, mother begging for food by the road... Another sleepless night behind, there comes the day full of dirty little jobs and ceaseless errands. After that, another night by the screaming baby. Now almost delirious, the girl starts to recognize the true root of evil in her wretched life is: this screaming infant. Greatly relieved by having found the easy solution, she strangles the baby, then "...quickly lies down on the floor, laughs with delight that she can sleep, and in a minute is sleeping as sound as the dead".

References

External links
 Спать хочется, the original Russian text
 Sleepy, the English translation

Short stories by Anton Chekhov
1888 short stories
Works originally published in Russian newspapers